The 1972 Purdue Boilermakers football team represented Purdue University during the 1972 Big Ten Conference football season. Led by Bob DeMoss in his third and final season as head coach, the Boilermakers compiled an overall record of 6–5 with a mark of 6–2 in conference play, placing third in the Big Ten. Purdue played home games at Ross–Ade Stadium in West Lafayette, Indiana.

This was the first season in which Purdue played an 11-game schedule. Every Big Ten team except the Boilermakers and Ohio State added an 11th game for the first time in 1971. The Buckeyes did not play an 11-game slate until 1974.

Schedule

Roster

Game summaries

Washington
Gary Danielson 16 rushes, 213 yards

at Minnesota

    
    
    
    
    

 Otis Armstrong 25 rushes, 152 yards

Northwestern
 Otis Armstrong 32 rushes, 233 yards

Wisconsin
 Otis Armstrong 19 rushes, 169 yards

Indiana

    
    
    
    
    
    
    

Otis Armstrong carried 32 times for 276 yards, breaking his own single-game school rushing record (233) and passing Wisconsin's Alan Ameche for most career rushing yards in the Big Ten with 3,316.

References

Purdue
Purdue Boilermakers football seasons
Purdue Boilermakers football